The General Directorate of Road Transport Services is an Albanian public state institution responsible for the registration of vehicles (equipping them with licence plates, registration and ownership titles), monitoring the qualification of drivers and issuing them with driving licenses, mandating technical control of road vehicles and creating a national electronic database of vehicles and drivers. 

The directorate performs the duties of a tax entity according to legal provisions and awards certifications to independent driving schools.
Established by a decision of the Council of Ministers no. 343 dated 21.07.1999, it is funded by and under the supervision of the Ministry of Infrastructure and Energy.

See also
Driving licence in Albania
Vehicle registration plates of Albania

References

Directorate
Albania